Something Money Can't Buy is a 1952 British comedy drama film directed by Pat Jackson and starring Patricia Roc, Anthony Steel and Moira Lister. The film was made with backing from the NFFC as part of its British Film-Makers project with the Rank Organisation. The film was distributed by Rank's General Film Distributors. In America it was released by Universal Pictures in 1953.

Production
The film was shot at Pinewood Studios near London. The film's sets were designed by the art director Alex Vetchinsky. The film was a rare comedy role for Steel, who made it immediately prior to shooting The Planter's Wife (1952). It involved Roc returning to London after two years in Paris, where she lived with her French husband. She and Steel had an affair during the making of the movie which resulted in Roc having Steel's baby. It was the only comedy Steel made while a star.

Plot
Harry and Anne Wilding return to civilian life after service in the army. They have trouble readjusting, and Harry eventually resigns from his council job and goes into business, selling food from a mobile canteen. Anne becomes jealous of the daughter of Harry's backer. Anne gives up her job to concentrate on her marriage.

Cast

 Patricia Roc as Anne Wilding
 Anthony Steel as Captain Harry Wilding
 Moira Lister as Diana Haverstock
 A. E. Matthews as Lord Haverstock
 David Hutcheson as Buster
 Michael Trubshawe as Willy
 Diane Hart as Joan
 Charles Victor as Borough Treasurer
 Henry Edwards as Gerald Forbes
 Mary Hinton as Mrs. Forbes
 Joss Ambler as Mr. Burton, the auctioneer
 Michael Brennan as Fairground boss
 Helen Goss as Mrs. Lindstrom
 D. A. Clarke-Smith as 	Critic
 Mara Lane as Film Star
 John Barry as Film Star
 Joe Linnane as Cameraman
 Dennis Arundell as 	Director
 Oscar Quitak as 2nd Assistant director
 Irene Prador as German maid
 Olwen Brookes as Lady at party
 Margaret Vyner as Actress at party
 Basil Dignam as 	Head Waiter
 Johnnie Schofield as 	Irish Policeman 
 Fred Griffiths as Customer at Fairground
 Ernie Rice as Boxing Booth Assistant 
 Avice Landone as Maternity Sister
 Dandy Nichols as Reassuring Mother

Reception
The Monthly Film Bulletin described it as "a double disappointment from the director of White Corridors; the poverty-stricken material apart, its staging is uncharacteristically flabby, with none of the polish and professionalism of its predecessor."

Variety said it was "handled with an assured light touch by a competent cast".

Pat Jackson later said "It ought to have been a good film, it had a certain charm, the story had a certain charm. I think I just did it badly, I directed badly, I don't know what it was, it just didn't work. It was my fault and that was it; it was a simple as that...It needed great lightness of touch, which I didn't get... It was all in the script, the script was charming. I think James and I wrote a nice script and he was a great help and a wonderful man, James. But no. I botched it."

References

Bibliography
 Harper, Sue & Porter, Vincent. British Cinema of the 1950s: The Decline of Deference. Oxford University Press, 2007.

External links
 
 

British comedy-drama films
Films scored by Nino Rota
1952 films
1952 comedy-drama films
Films shot at Pinewood Studios
Films directed by Pat Jackson
Films set in Germany
Films set in London
British black-and-white films
1950s English-language films
1950s British films